What You Know bout Me? Part 2 is a studio album by American rapper Messy Marv.[]

An audio video for the song "Playin' with My Nose" has been viewed over 1 million times on YouTube.

Track listing
Intro
Playin' Wit My Nose
Headline & The Feature
B
Doin' the Most (featuring Selau)
The Industry's New Problem (Skit)
When You See Me
Shackles [Remix]
You Were My World (featuring Jessica Rabbit)
Somthin' Exotic
The Black Top

References

External links
 

2006 albums
Messy Marv albums
Sequel albums